[1.1.1]Propellane is an organic compound, the simplest member of the propellane family. The molecular structure consists of three rings of three carbon atoms each, sharing one C–C bond.

[1.1.1]Propellane is a highly strained molecule. The bonds of the two central carbon atoms have an inverted tetrahedral geometry, and the length of the central bond is 160 pm. The strength of that bond is disputed; estimates vary from 59–65 kcal/mol to no strength at all. The energy of the biradical state (with no central bond at all) is calculated to be 80 kcal/mol higher.  At 114 °C it will spontaneously isomerize to 3-methylidenecyclobutene (5 below) with a half-life of 5 minutes. Its strain energy is estimated to be 102 kcal/mol (427 kJ/mol).  Surprisingly, [1.1.1]propellane is persistent at room temperature and is somewhat less susceptible to thermal decomposition than the less strained (90 kcal/mol) [2.2.2]propellane system, which has an estimated half-life of only about 1 h at 25 °C. This unusual stability is attributed to delocalisation of electron density from the bond between the central carbon atoms onto the bridging carbon atoms.

The type of bonding in this molecule has been explained in terms of charge-shift bonding.

Synthesis
[1.1.1]Propellane was first reported by K. Wiberg and F. Walker in 1982. The synthesis commences with cyclopropanation of 1,1-bis(chloromethyl)ethylene, according to the following scheme:

Synthesis begins with conversion of the 1,3-di-carboxylic acid of bicyclo[1.1.1]pentane 1 in a Hunsdiecker reaction to the corresponding dibromide 2 followed by a coupling reaction with n-butyllithium. The final product 3 was isolated by column chromatography at −30 °C.

However, a much simplified synthesis was published by Szeimies. It starts with dibromocarbene addition to the alkene bond of 3-chloro-2-(chloromethyl)propene 6 followed by deprotonation by methyllithium and nucleophilic displacements in 7 not isolated but kept in solution at −196 °C.

Reactions

Acetic acid addition 
[1.1.1]Propellane spontaneously reacts with acetic acid to yield a methylidenecyclobutane ester (4 above).

Polymerization 
[1.1.1]Propellane undergoes a polymerization reaction where the central C–C bond is split and connected to adjacent monomer units, resulting in staffanes.

A radical polymerization initiated by methyl formate and benzoyl peroxide results in a distribution of oligomers.  An anionic addition polymerization with n-butyllithium results in a fully polymerized product. X-ray diffraction of the polymer shows that the connecting C–C bonds have bond lengths of only 148 pm.

The compound 1,3-dehydroadamantane, which can be viewed as a bridged [1.3.3]propellane, also polymerizes in a similar way.

See also
[2.2.2]Propellane
Bicyclo(1.1.1)pentane which lacks a bond between the bridgehead carbons.

References

Bicycloalkanes
Tricyclic compounds